Todd Michael Peck (born January 29, 1986) is an American professional stock car racing driver. He competes part-time in the NASCAR Craftsman Truck Series, driving the No. 96 Toyota Tundra for Peck Motorsports. He has also raced in the NASCAR Xfinity Series and the X-1R Pro Cup Series.

Racing career

Xfinity Series
Peck made his Xfinity debut at New Hampshire driving for Rick Ware Racing.  Peck started 35th and finished 30th.  It would be his only start of the year.

In 2016, Peck ran occasionally for B. J. McLeod Motorsports, mostly in the No. 15 car. Peck recorded five top 30 finishes in 11 starts, and also failed to finish three races, including a last-place finish in the Lilly Diabetes 250.

NASCAR Craftsman Truck Series

Peck's first year in the series was 2011, driving three races for Peck Motorsports, a team owned by his father, Michael Peck.  Todd recorded a best finish of 27th at O'Reilly Raceway Park. Peck ran one race for his father and one race for SS-Green Light Racing in 2012.  He scored a best finish of 18th, at the fall Phoenix race.

In 2013, Peck ran three races, two for his father and one for Norm Benning Racing. His best finish was 27th at Pocono. In 2014, he started five races, four for his father and one for SS-Green Light. His best effort was a 20th at Chicagoland.

Peck returned in 2015 and attempted six races and made three with Peck Motorsports and one for B. J. McLeod Motorsports, with the best finish being a 21st at Pocono. Running three races in 2016 for his father, Peck recorded a best finish of 21st at Pocono Raceway, and finished 25th and 29th in subsequent starts.

In 2017, Peck started a career-high ten races for Copp Motorsports, starting and parking eight. Peck tied his career-best finish of 18th place at the season-opener at Daytona avoiding accidents.

In 2020, Peck drove again for his family team for the season-opening race at Daytona, but failed to qualify. The team returned to using the No. 96 after Niece Motorsports had taken their old No. 40 and the No. 96 was not being used.

In 2021, he drove for Cram Racing Enterprises at the CRC Brakleen 150 with sponsorship from Holla Vodka.

K&N Pro Series East
Peck drove in sixteen races from 2007–2010, scoring a best finish of fourteenth at Thompson Speedway Motorsports Park in 2009.  He received funding from Addiction Management Center for a large part of his career.

X-1R Pro Cup Series
From 2002 to 2006, Peck made 38 starts.  He scored one top-ten finish, a tenth at South Boston in 2005.

Personal life
Peck was diagnosed with rheumatoid arthritis when he was fifteen and is one of the leading racecar drivers with that condition.
His uncle Tom Peck raced in the Xfinity Series from 1984 to 1995.

Motorsports career results

NASCAR
(key) (Bold – Pole position awarded by qualifying time. Italics – Pole position earned by points standings or practice time. * – Most laps led.)

Xfinity Series

Craftsman Truck Series

 Season still in progress
 Ineligible for series points

K&N Pro Series East

References

External links
 

1986 births
Living people
People from York County, Pennsylvania
NASCAR drivers
Racing drivers from Pennsylvania